Comparative Biochemistry and Physiology Part D: Genomics and Proteomics  is a peer-reviewed scientific journal that covers research in biochemistry and physiology.

External links 

Biochemistry journals
Physiology journals
Elsevier academic journals